Bebil (Gbïgbïl) is a Bantu language of Cameroon. It is mutually intelligible with other Beti dialects.

There are 6,000 speakers (according to Nguetse Mezatio Tsague in 2003) in the Eastern Region, in the communes of Diang and Belabo in Lom-et-Djerem department.

References

Beti languages
Languages of Cameroon